Calligrammes: Poems of Peace and War 1913-1916, is a collection of poems by Guillaume Apollinaire which was first published in 1918 (see 1918 in poetry). Calligrammes is noted for how the typeface and spatial arrangement of the words on a page plays just as much of a role in the meaning of each poem as the words themselves – a form called a calligram. In this sense, the collection can be seen as either concrete poetry or visual poetry. Apollinaire described his work as follows:

The Calligrammes are an idealisation of free verse poetry and typographical precision in an era when typography is reaching a brilliant end to its career, at the dawn of the new means of reproduction that are the cinema and the phonograph. (Guillaume Apollinaire, in a letter to André Billy)

Notes

References
Apollinaire, Guillaume. Calligrammes. Preface by Michel Butor. (Éditions Gallimard, 1995)

External links  
 Calligrammes; poèmes de la paix et da la guerre, 1913-1916 digitized original at the Internet Archive
 Calligrammes (full text)
 Calligrammes, for piano trio

French poems
1918 books
Works by Guillaume Apollinaire